Last Hero 7: Lost in the Paradise (Posledniy Geroy 6: Zabytyje v Rayu) was the seventh season of Russian television series Last Hero, a franchised version of Expedition Robinson, better known as Survivor, hosted by Ksenia Sobchak. 21 contestants took part and competed against each other for 37 days to try and outlast each other to become the Sole Survivor.

Contestants

The Total Votes is the number of votes a castaway has received during Tribal Councils where the castaway is eligible to be voted out of the game. It does not include the votes received during the final Tribal Council.

References

External links
 Official website 

Last Hero seasons
2008 Russian television seasons
2009 Russian television seasons
Television shows filmed in Panama